The Old Man is a 1931 British mystery film directed by Manning Haynes and starring Maisie Gay, Anne Grey and Lester Matthews. It is based on the play of the same name by Edgar Wallace, with several actors reprising their roles. The film marked the screen debut of Scottish actor Finlay Currie.

It was shot at Beaconsfield Studios with sets designed by the art director Norman G. Arnold.

Cast
 Maisie Gay as Mrs. Harris 
 Anne Grey as Lady Arranways 
 Lester Matthews as Keith Keller 
 Cecil Humphreys as Lord Arranways 
 D. A. Clarke-Smith as John Lorney 
 Diana Beaumont as Millie Jeans 
 Gerald Rawlinson as Dick Mayford 
 Frank Stanmore as Charles 
 Finlay Currie as Rennett

References

Bibliography
 Low, Rachael. Filmmaking in 1930s Britain. George Allen & Unwin, 1985.
 Wood, Linda. British Films, 1927-1939. British Film Institute, 1986.

External links

1931 films
1931 mystery films
British mystery films
Films based on works by Edgar Wallace
British black-and-white films
Films set in England
British Lion Films films
Films shot at Beaconsfield Studios
British films based on plays
Films directed by H. Manning Haynes
1930s British films
1930s English-language films